Chișinău City Hall is a historical and architectural monument built in Italian Gothic style located in Central Chișinău, Moldova. Originally constructed to house the city Duma in 1901, the building was nearly destroyed during World War II. It was rebuilt in the postwar period based on surviving images and construction plans.

Gallery

See also 
 Mayor of Chișinău

References

External links 
 Chisinau City Office 
 Primaria Chisinau Official Website  
 Primaria Chisinau Official Facebook Page

City and town halls in Moldova
Government buildings completed in 1901
Buildings and structures in Chișinău
Art Nouveau architecture in Moldova
Art Nouveau government buildings